Bored refers to a state of boredom.

Bored may also refer to:

 Bored (band), Australian punk rock band
 "Bored" (song), a 2017 song by Billie Eilish from the soundtrack album of 13 Reasons Why
 "Bored", a song by Death Angel from the album Frolic Through the Park, 1988
 "Bored", a song by the Deftones from the album Adrenaline, 1995
 "Bored" (悶), a song by Faye Wong from the album Faye Wong, 1997
 "I Am Bored", a song by The Microphones from the album The Glow Pt. 2, 2001
 "Bored", a song by Bea Miller from the album Aurora, 2018

See also 

 
 
 Bore (disambiguation)
 Boring (disambiguation)
 Boredom (disambiguation)
 Board (disambiguation)
 Drilling (disambiguation)
 Drill (disambiguation)